The women's 400 metre freestyle event at the 1948 Olympic Games took place between 5 and 7 August at the Empire Pool. This swimming event used freestyle swimming, which means that the method of the stroke is not regulated (unlike backstroke, breaststroke, and butterfly events). Nearly all swimmers use the front crawl or a variant of that stroke. Because an Olympic size swimming pool is 50 meters long, this race consisted of eight lengths of the pool.

Medalists

Results

Heats

Semifinals

Final

Key: OR = Olympic record

References

Women's freestyle 400 metre
1948 in women's swimming
Women's events at the 1948 Summer Olympics